Maxacapan is a village and ejido, with a population of 981 in 2010, within the municipality of Catemaco, located on the edge of Laguna Catemaco,  south of Catemaco City in south-central Veracruz. Locally, the ejido is well known for its tegogolos harvested from Laguna Catemaco.

References

External links
 Catemaco.info: The villages of Catemaco

Los Tuxtlas